Sir Henry Gates (c. 1515 – 7 April 1589), of Seamer, Yorkshire; Kilburn, Middlesex; Kew, Surrey and Havering, Essex, was an English courtier and politician.

He was a younger son of Sir Geoffrey Gates of High Easter, Essex and the brother of John Gates (executed for treason in 1553).

He became a Member (MP) of the Parliament of England for New Shoreham in 1545, Bridport in 1547 and  Bramber in 1549.

He was appointed a Gentleman of the Privy Chamber under King Edward VI by June 1551, a position he held until the king's death in 1553. He was knighted by the Lord Protector in 1547. He acquired a number of public offices such as Comptroller of Petty Customs (1551–53) and Receiver-General of the Duchy of Cornwall (1552–53). With his brother he supported the bid in 1553 to put Lady Jane Grey on the English throne and the two were arrested, sent to the tower and found guilty of treason. His brother was executed but Henry was eventually pardoned, but with the loss of all his offices. He moved to live in Seamer, near Scarborough in the North Riding of Yorkshire, and began a new life in the north of England.

After Queen Elizabeth I acceded to the throne in 1558 he was able to acquire the positions of Custos Rotulorum of the North Riding of Yorkshire by 1562 and Vice-Admiral of Yorkshire by 1565, serving in the latter role until 1573. He renewed his Parliamentary career with his election for Yorkshire in 1571 and 1586, and Scarborough in 1563 and 1572.

He went to Scotland with William Drury and met Regent Moray in the Great Hall of Stirling Castle on 19 January 1570, and they had a discussion in his bedchamber after dinner. Moray was assassinated three days later in Linlithgow.

He died at Kilburn, Middlesex in 1589. He married twice; firstly Lucy, the daughter of Charles Knyvet, with whom he had 4 sons and 4 daughters and secondly Catherine, the daughter of Watkin Vaughan of Bredwardine, Herefordshire and the widow of James Boyle of Hereford. His son Edward also became an MP.

He recorded the date & place of birth of his children in his family bible.

References

1515 births
1589 deaths
English knights
People from Kilburn, London
People from Kew, London
People from the London Borough of Havering
People from Seamer, Scarborough
English MPs 1545–1547
English MPs 1547–1552
English MPs 1563–1567
English MPs 1571
English MPs 1572–1583
English MPs 1586–1587
Knights Bachelor